Manuel Jiménez may refer to:

Entertainment
 Manuel Jiménez (musician) (1895–1975), "El Canario," Puerto Rican musician of the plena genre, 1930s
 Manuel Jiménez Ramírez (1919–2005), Mexican carver, sculptor, and painter

Politics
 Manuel Jimenes (1808–1854), second president of the Dominican Republic
 Manuel Jiménez de Parga (1929–2014), Spanish lawyer, politician, and diplomat
 Manuel Humberto Cota Jiménez (born 1961), PRI Senator from Nayarit
 Manuel Minjares Jiménez (born 1967), Mexican politician affiliated with the National Action Party

Sports
 Manny Jiménez (1938–2017), Major League Baseball left fielder in the 1960s
 Manuel Jiménez (archer) (born 1940), Spanish archer
 Manuel Jiménez (footballer, born 1956), Spanish former football defender
 Manolo Jiménez (footballer, born 1960), Spanish football manager
 Manolo Jiménez (footballer, born 1964), Spanish football defender and manager
 Manolo Jiménez (footballer, born 1976), Andorran former football midfielder
 Manuel Torres (footballer, born 1991), Spanish football midfielder
 Manuel Jiménez (footballer, born 1992), Mexican football defender
 Manuel Álvarez Jiménez (born 1928), Chilean football defender
 Manuel Jiménez Moreno "Chicuelo" (1902–1967), Spanish bullfighter

See also
José Manuel Jiménez (disambiguation)